A living brooch, also known as a ma'kech, makech, and maquech, is a brooch made from a living beetle of the genus Zopherus (one of the three genera of ironclad beetle), particularly the species Zopherus chilensis. The brooches are decorated with paste gemstones, bric-à-brac, and imitation gold, and are tethered to a woman's blouse by a small chain.  Such brooches have traditionally been made in the Yucatan Peninsula of Mexico as objects of personal adornment.  They do not move quickly, are very hardy, and are capable of living for over 3 years without food or water.

References

Jewellery
Insects in culture
Cruelty to animals